Turbo Racing may refer to:

Hot Wheels Turbo Racing, a Nintendo 64 video game
Al Unser Jr.'s Turbo Racing, NES video game